Siege of Tarragona may refer to several historical sieges of Tarragona including:

 Siege of Tarragona (1644), during the Catalan Revolt
 Siege of Tarragona (1811), during the Peninsular War
 Siege of Tarragona (1813), during the Peninsular War